Bulbophyllum biflorum (two-flowered bulbophyllum) is a species of orchid. This species was found in Java, Sumatra, Bali, Borneo, the Philippines, and the Thai and Malaysian peninsula. The flower size is 7.5 cm long.

References

External links 

biflorum
Plants described in 1855